The Glace Bay Heritage Museum or the Old Town Hall is located in Glace Bay, Nova Scotia, in the one-time town hall. 

The town's memorial to its deceased coal miners is located on the museum grounds. 

Some items contained in the museum are:

 Central School "1988" Time Capsule 
 Joey Mullins' (Olympic Runner 1960 Olympics) original running shoes 
 Extensive mining photographs and artifacts 
 Collection of yearbooks and yearly almanacs 
 Fishing artifacts

Affiliations
The Museum is affiliated with: CMA,  CHIN, and Virtual Museum of Canada.

References

External links

 Official Site
 Glace Bay Heritage Museum - Original official site (archived)

Buildings and structures in the Cape Breton Regional Municipality
Museums in Cape Breton County
History museums in Nova Scotia